The Military ranks of Qatar are the military insignia forces used by the Qatar Armed Forces.

Commissioned officer ranks
The rank insignia of commissioned officers.

Other ranks
The rank insignia of non-commissioned officers and enlisted personnel.

References

External links
 

Qatar
Military of Qatar
Qatar